Two submarines of the Royal Navy have borne the name HMS Vox, after the Latin for Voice:

She was returned to the Royal Navy in 1946, and scrapped in 1949.
 - a British V-class submarine launched in 1943 and scrapped in 1946.

Royal Navy ship names